John Henry Sheridan is a musician and composer from Brooklyn, NY. He holds a Bachelor of Music Composition, Guitar from Brooklyn College, City University of New York. John's composition work has been reviewed in the New York Times and his single "Lack of Faith" was featured on the show Dog the Bounty Hunter. He has collaborated with David Z and Paulie Z of ZO2, and producer Sylvia Massy.

Albums

References

External links
John Henry Sheridan and the Love Dinosaurs

American male composers
21st-century American composers
Living people
Musicians from Brooklyn
Year of birth missing (living people)
21st-century American male musicians
Brooklyn College alumni